John Tucker Battle (October 1, 1902 – October 31, 1962) was an American screenwriter. He wrote for television programs including Bonanza, Have Gun, Will Travel, Maverick, Colt .45, The Restless Gun, Bat Masterson and Black Saddle. He also wrote for and acted in radio programs in the 1930s and 1940s. He was buried in Forest Lawn Memorial Park.

Selected filmography 
 Irish Eyes Are Smiling (1944)
 Captain Eddie (1945)
 Man Alive (1945)
 Captain from Castile (1947) - (uncredited)
 So Dear to My Heart (1948)
 The Frogmen (1951)
 Invaders from Mars (1953) - (uncredited)
 A Man Alone (1955)
 Lisbon (1956)
 Shoot-Out at Medicine Bend (1957)

References

External links 

1902 births
1962 deaths
People from Waco, Texas
Screenwriters from Texas
American radio writers
American male screenwriters
American television writers
American male television writers
20th-century American screenwriters
Burials at Forest Lawn Memorial Park (Glendale)